Giuseppe Molteni (Affori, Milan, 1800 – Milan, 1867) was an Italian painter.

Biography

Forced to abandon his studies at the Brera Academy for financial reasons, Molteni took up the restoration of ancient paintings as a pupil of Giuseppe Guizzardi in Bologna. On his return to Milan, he soon became one of the most sought-after restorers of the day, a consultant to the Louvre and the British Museum as well as the leading collectors and connoisseurs in Milan and Europe as a whole. He also devoted his energies to painting.

In 1828 that he inaugurated a genre of portraiture characterised by the meticulous depiction of sumptuous costumes and settings, which proved an extraordinary success and brought him into direct competition with Francesco Hayez. The period spent at the court in Vienna in 1837 to paint the portrait of Emperor Ferdinand I led to an appreciation of Biedermeier painting and friendship with the painter Friedrich von Amerling, and the style of Johann Friedrich Overbeck. A switch to genre painting came in 1837 with scenes of contemporary everyday life that proved an immediate success with the public and critics. Molteni’s regular participation in the Brera exhibitions slackened in the 1850s and ceased when he was appointed curator of the Academy’s gallery in 1854 and stopped painting altogether.

Gallery

References
 Elena Lissoni, Giuseppe Molteni , online catalogue Artgate by Fondazione Cariplo, 2010, CC BY-SA (source for the first revision of this article).

External links
 
 

19th-century Italian painters
Italian male painters
Brera Academy alumni
Italian romantic painters
1800 births
1867 deaths
Painters from Milan
19th-century Italian male artists